In geometry, the great inverted snub icosidodecahedron (or great vertisnub icosidodecahedron) is a uniform star polyhedron, indexed as U69. It is given a Schläfli symbol sr{,3}, and Coxeter-Dynkin diagram . In the book Polyhedron Models by Magnus Wenninger, the polyhedron is misnamed great snub icosidodecahedron, and vice versa.

Cartesian coordinates 
Cartesian coordinates for the vertices of a great inverted snub icosidodecahedron are all the even permutations of
 (±2α, ±2, ±2β),
 (±(α−βτ−1/τ), ±(α/τ+β−τ), ±(−ατ−β/τ−1)),
 (±(ατ−β/τ+1), ±(−α−βτ+1/τ), ±(−α/τ+β+τ)),
 (±(ατ−β/τ−1), ±(α+βτ+1/τ), ±(−α/τ+β−τ)) and
 (±(α−βτ+1/τ), ±(−α/τ−β−τ), ±(−ατ−β/τ+1)),
with an even number of plus signs, where
 α = ξ−1/ξ
and
 β = −ξ/τ+1/τ2−1/(ξτ),
where τ = (1+)/2 is the golden mean and
ξ is the greater positive real solution to ξ3−2ξ=−1/τ, or approximately 1.2224727.
Taking the odd permutations of the above coordinates with an odd number of plus signs gives another form, the enantiomorph of the other one.

The circumradius for unit edge length is

The four positive real roots of the sextic in 

are the circumradii of the snub dodecahedron (U29), great snub icosidodecahedron (U57), great inverted snub icosidodecahedron (U69), and great retrosnub icosidodecahedron (U74).

Related polyhedra

Great inverted pentagonal hexecontahedron 

The great inverted pentagonal hexecontahedron (or petaloidal trisicosahedron) is a nonconvex isohedral polyhedron. It is composed of 60 concave pentagonal faces, 150 edges and 92 vertices.

It is the dual of the uniform great inverted snub icosidodecahedron.

Proportions

Let  be the smallest positive  zero of the polynomial . Each face has three long and two short edges. The ratio  between the lengths of the long and the short edges is given by
. 
The dihedral angle equals . Part of each face lies inside the solid, hence is invisible in solid models. The other two zeroes of the polynomial  play a similar role in the description of the great pentagonal hexecontahedron and the great pentagrammic hexecontahedron.

See also 
 List of uniform polyhedra
 Great snub icosidodecahedron
 Great retrosnub icosidodecahedron

References
 p. 126

External links 
 
 

Uniform polyhedra